Statistics football matches of Dhivehi League in the 2008 season.

Overview
Club Valencia won both the Dhivehi League and the Maldives National Championship.

Clubs
Club Valencia
Kalhaidhoo ZJ
Maziya S&RC
New Radiant SC 
Thinadhoo ZC
VB Sports
Victory Sports Club
Vyansa

Final standings

Promotion/relegation playoff for 2009 Dhivehi League

References
RSSSF

Dhivehi League seasons
Maldives
Maldives
1